The Embassy of the State of Palestine in Vietnam is the diplomatic mission of the Palestine in Vietnam. It is located in Đống Đa District in Hanoi.

See also

List of diplomatic missions in Vietnam.
List of diplomatic missions of Palestine.

References

Diplomatic missions of the State of Palestine
Palestine
State of Palestine–Vietnam relations